The Eritrean National Football Federation (E.N.F.F.) is the governing body of football in Eritrea.

History
The ENFF was founded in 1996 and affiliated to FIFA and the Confederation of African Football (CAF) in 1998.

It organizes the Eritrean Premier League and the Eritrea national football team.

Logos

References

Sports governing bodies in Eritrea
Eritrea
Sports organizations established in 1996
Football in Eritrea